Monsefú is a town in Northern Peru, capital of the Monsefú district in the Chiclayo Province that is part of the Lambayeque Region. It is renowned for its food and handicrafts, which are on display at the annual FEXTICUM festival, named in 1973 by Professor Limberg Chero Ballena and held in July during Fiestas Patrias.  Monsefú is also the home of the cumbia groups Grupo 5 and Hermanos Yaipen.  Monsefú was elevated to the category of "city" on October 26, 1888.

Etymology
The priest Fernando de la Carrera, in his work Arte de la lengua yunga, argues that the word "monsefu" comes from Omænssefæc.

History
Before the arrival of the Spanish, Monsefú would have been part of the chieftainship of Cinto, with the name of Chuspo, whose main center have been located in the vicinity of the hill San Bartolo. Early in the second half of the sixteenth century, they would have been reduced in Callanca, heavy rains and floods in 1578, blighted the crops and affected the population composed of "huacotoledistas". In 1612, the population of Callanca were attacked by a disease. The population was reduced by the disease and survivors after a few years were located in what is now Monsefú.

The headquarters of the Chilean army during the occupation of Peru (1879-1893) was located in Monsefú. Chilean troops entered Monsefú without shooting a single bullet. The commander in chief of the invader, Gen. Patricio Lynch, acted as a major of the city. During his tenure, he improved the sanitation system, organized a garbage collection service, built the first sewage system and reorganized the whole administration. Historians concur that Gen. Lynch was probably the best authority of Monsefú at that time.

The town of Monsefú was created at the time of Independence by the Liberator Simon Bolivar.

Climate
It has a varied semitropical temperature, since part of its territory is on the shore of the sea, and another is located in the valley of the Reque River.

References

External links
  Municipalidad Distrital de Monsefú

Populated places in the Lambayeque Region